Crassispira aequatorialis is a species of sea snail, a marine gastropod mollusk in the family Pseudomelatomidae.

Description

Distribution
This marine species occurs off Northeast Sumatra and was found at a depth of 750 m.

References

 Thiele, J., 1925. Gastropoden der Deutschen Tiefsee-Expedition. In:. Wissenschaftliche Ergebnisse der Deutschen Tiefsee-Expedition II. Teil, 17(2), Gutstav Fischer, Berlin.
 A. Sysoev, 1997 , Mollusca Gastropoda: New deep-water turrid gastropods (Conoidea) from eastern Indonesia ; In: A. CROSNIER & P. BOUCHET (eds). Résultats des Campagnes MUSORSTOM, Volume 16. Mém. Mus. natn. Hist, nat., 172: 325-355. Paris .

External links
 

aequatorialis
Gastropods described in 1925